The 1983 NASL Playoffs was the post-season championship of North American Soccer League (NASL), the top soccer league in the United States and Canada at that time. It was the 16th edition of the NASL Playoffs, the tournament culminating at the end of the 2019 regular season. The playoffs began on September 5, 1983, and concluded with the Soccer Bowl '83 on October 1.

New York Cosmos were the defending NASL champions, having won their fifth title in Soccer Bowl '82, but they were eliminated by Montreal Manic in the Quarterfinals. The 1983 regular season best record were Vancouver Whitecaps, but they were also eliminated in the Quarterfinals, by Toronto Blizzard (1971–1984).

Qualified teams
Eastern Division
New York Cosmos
Chicago Sting
Toronto Blizzard
Montreal Manic

Southern Division
Tulsa Roughnecks
Fort Lauderdale Strikers

Western Division
Vancouver Whitecaps
Golden Bay Earthquakes

Division standings
W = Wins, L = Losses, GF = Goals For, GA = Goals Against, PT= point system

6 points for a win in regulation and overtime, 4 point for a shootout win,
0 points for a loss,
1 bonus point for each regulation goal scored, up to three per game.
-Premiers (most points). -Best record. -Other playoff teams.

Bracket

References

1983 North American Soccer League season